Ten Days Without Love is a 2001 Spanish film directed by Miguel Albaladejo starring Sergi López and Mariola Fuentes.

Plot 
Miguel's life changes completely when his wife starts a romance with his father. He is a psychiatrist, and one of his patients steals his wallet. When he goes to his place to retrieve it, he meets the patient's sister, Jasmina, an outspoken hairdresser. They fall in love, and everyone ends happily.

Cast

Release 
The film was theatrically released in Spain on 2 February 2001.

Reception 
Jonathan Holland of Variety deemed the "superbly scripted romance" to be "a deft, practiced piece of charming ensemble playing that presses all the right emotional buttons without forgoing its socio-critical edge".

Accolades 

|-
| align = "center" rowspan = "2" | 2002 || rowspan = "2" | 16th Goya Awards || Best Supporting Actor || Emilio Gutiérrez Caba ||  || rowspan = "2" | 
|-
| Best Original Song || Olga Román || 
|}

See also 
 List of Spanish films of 2001

References

External links
 

2001 films
2000s Spanish-language films
Madrid in fiction
2001 romantic comedy films
Films scored by Lucio Godoy
Spanish romantic comedy films
2000s Spanish films